Escape To Asylum is an album (LP Vinyl) released by the Fullerton College Jazz Band in 1982, it was the initial recording from an award winning group who become the Down Beat Magazine 1st Place Award Winner in the College Big Band Jazz category for 1983.

Background 
In 1981 the Music Department at Fullerton College built a 16 track in house recording facility which was to serve as a teaching tool for both student music groups  and students wanting to take recording technology classes at a vocational level.  Escape To Asylum is the first of many albums to come out of this studio to feature the award winning Fullerton College Jazz Band.  The LP contains tracks from two of the Fullerton College jazz groups: Jazz Band I and Connection Jazz Combo.  The roster on this album is self-evident as to the diversity and level of student musicians Fullerton College developed at that time and has for many years.

Tracks for this album are also on the AM~PM Records 1985 release Unforgettable and also on the 1998 CD Celebration! The Fullerton College Jazz Festival 25th Anniversary.

Track listing

Recording Sessions 

 recorded January 28 and 29, 1982, Fullerton College, Fullerton, California

Personnel

Musicians 
Conductors: Terry Blackley and James Linahon
Trumpet (guest soloist): James Linahon
Vocal: Darlene Reynolds
Saxes and woodwinds: Steve Villa, Jack Cooper, Harold Manning, Dave Kraus, George Reynoso
Trumpets and flugelhorns: John Deemer, Rick Jacobson, Mark New, Brett Pallet
Trombones: Tim Hoff, Tommy Griffith, Tim Moynahan, Bob Heller
Guitar: Bruce Wall
Piano: Joe Van Gelder, Jeff Woodcock
Bass: Tom Nunes
Drums: Kelly Small
Percussion: Pat Ready

Production 
Recording engineers: Alex Cima and James Linahon
Second recording engineer: Wade McDaniel
Mixing engineers: Alex Cima, Terry Blackley, Roger Myers, and James Linahon.
Mastering: L.R.S. Inc.
Photography: Tom Leonard
Cover art: Joel Cadman
Liner notes: Terry Blackley

References

External links

 Official website

1982 albums
Fullerton College Jazz Band albums